Shingle Hollow is a valley in the U.S. state of New York.

Shingle Hollow took its name from a shingle mill.

References

Landforms of Rensselaer County, New York
Valleys of New York (state)